The southern slider (Lerista dorsalis)  is a species of skink found in South Australia and Western Australia.

References

Lerista
Reptiles described in 1985
Taxa named by Glen Milton Storr